Zachary "Zach" Hsieh (born January 14, 1999), also known as ZHC, is an American YouTuber known for creating art and illustration videos on YouTube.

Early life and education 
Hsieh was born in San Jose, California on January 14, 1999. Interested in art from an early age, he was inspired to practice comic book style art by illustrated novels such as Captain Underpants, and wanted to be a Marvel Comics artist. At 16 years old, he committed to spending 12 hours a day or more practicing drawing. He went on to study at the School of Visual Arts in New York City. He began his YouTube channel in 2016, whilst he was a student at the school, and later dropped out to focus on practicing his art online.

Internet career 
When Hsieh began his YouTube channel, he created mainly tutorial videos, including tutorials on crosshatching and refilling Copic markers. His channel found viral success after the release of a 2018 "re-drawing" video in which he recreated hyperrealistic copies of a friend's drawings. Subsequently, his content evolved into competition based drawing videos and vlogs. He also expanded into MrBeast style videos and stunt-philanthropy, including giveaways, contests, and marathon livestreams. By early 2019, Hsieh had reached a million subscribers and had become able to support himself full-time through his YouTube videos. That February, his channel was noticed by fellow YouTubers MrBeast and PewDiePie after he released videos in which he drew massive superhero illustrations of them, and experienced a surge of rapid growth. He went on to make official collaboration videos with MrBeast, in which he customized products such as an iPhone and a Tesla car, as well as influencer Charli D'Amelio and DJ Steve Aoki. In April 2020, Hsieh was signed by creator management company Night Media. In September 2020, Hsieh launched the YouTube channel ZHC Shorts to release YouTube Shorts content on.

In February 2021, following grooming allegations against former host James Charles, it was announced that Hsieh would host the second season of the YouTube Originals show Instant Influencer. That March, Hsieh launched a collection of NFT art known as Critters By ZHC on the Nifty Gateway marketplace. The art features four characters that are also heavily featured in his content and merchandising: Bun Bun, Fayur, Turkey, and Scrunchie.

Philanthropy 
Hsieh's content has also expanded to incorporate philanthropy into his art videos by painting everyday objects for people. During the COVID-19 pandemic, Hsieh and his team of more than 24 artists painted classrooms at Strive Prep Montbello in Denver. He also painted murals at AdventHealth For Children in Orlando, Florida, and donated iPads and $240,000 to the hospital. In February 2021, Hsieh hosted a competition between himself and artists from his team to customize a 10 foot tall PlayStation 5 for charity. As part of the video, over 24 PlayStation 5s were donated to Children in Need. Hsieh and his team hand-painted every home in the Arroyo Seco Tiny Home Village in Highland Park, Los Angeles, which was completed in October 2021. The village provides transitional housing for those experiencing homelessness in the community.

Awards and nominations

Notes

References 

1999 births
English-language YouTube channels
Living people